Octane is a British car magazine, published monthly, and concentrating on classic and performance cars. It was launched in 2003, and is now published by Autovia Limited. The magazine features news, road tests and buyers guides of both classic cars and some modern performance cars. It also has an "For Sale" section that lists cars from all around the world.

It has a cover price of £4.70 in the United Kingdom, and sells an average of 35,000 copies. The Octane office is situated in Wollaston, Northamptonshire.

History
Octane Magazine was launched in May 2003, following a chance meeting between David Lillywhite and Geoff Love. They were invited to a meeting to discuss the launch of a motoring magazine (eventually to be launched as Practical Performance Car)., but came away with the idea for a classic magazine that focused on the upper end of the market.

A team was quickly put together consisting of Robert Coucher, previously editor of Classic Cars during its heyday; Sanjay Seetanah, ex Classic & Sports car and Classic Cars Advertising Manager; David Lilly white, ex-deputy editor on Classic Cars and freelance writer for a number of publications, and Geoff Love, ex Publishing Director at E MAP (now Bauer) Automotive.

Classic & Sportscar and Classic Cars were publishing magazines that targeted a broad range of cars from restoration projects to exotic supercars but there was nothing really targeting the serious collector, the historic racing driver or the serious enthusiast. This was the market opportunity that the team of four identified and where Octane was to launch into.

The editorial concept was established and the business plan created. All the team now required was funding. Obtaining finance for a magazine launch is not easy, but Sanjay was a Crystal Palace fan and knew another fan who revealed he had Simon Jordan's phone number on his mobile. In a drunken moment Sanjay challenged his friend to call the Crystal Palace Chairman and see if he wanted to invest in a classic car magazine.

As luck would have it, Simon was looking for investments, and a couple of weeks later the four found themselves in the boardroom of the Grosvenor House Hotel being grilled by Simon, his tax adviser, and financial advisor in a scene reminiscent of the Dragon's Den. During the day, Simon had been presented to by five other potential entrepreneurs, and the Octane presentation came at 5.30pm.

After an hour of tough questions, Simon turned to his advisers and agreed to invest the money.

That was February 2003, and the magazine launched on 15 May of that year. The magazine achieved critical acclaim within the market very early on, and advertisers were prepared to support the magazine. Commercial success was slower to follow, but over time circulation grew to over 30,000 per issue.

The initial business plan outlined a trade sale within a three to five-year period as the most likely exit strategy for Simon Jordan, and it also identified Dennis Publishing as the most likely buyer. It was no coincidence that Octane took evo as its template in terms of production values and physical size. Remarkably, Dennis Publishing made an initial contact to say they liked what Octane was doing within six months of launch, and indicated they would be following its progress.

They had recently acquired evo magazine, so Octane would make a good fit in their portfolio.

It was three years later that Dennis expressed a real interest in the acquisition of Octane magazine, and this led to the purchase in May 2007. Since then the magazine has gone from strength to strength, with the founding team still at the helm. In addition to the version for the United Kingdom, Octane is now published in Italy, The Netherlands, Germany and Sweden. A Japanese and an Argentine edition launched in 2013.

In 2021, Octane and the rest of Dennis Publishing's automotive assets were spun-off as independent company called Autovia.

The team

Editor: James Elliot

International Editor: Robert Coucher

Deputy Editor: Mark Dixon

Production Editor: Glen Waddington

Art Editor: Mark Sommer

Designer: Robert Hefferon

Staff writer: Matthew Hayward

Columnists: Nick Mason, Jay Leno, Brian Johnson, Tony Dron

Content
Regular features include:
Glossy features on the classic and performance cars
News and market analysis
Icon
Gone But Not Forgotten
Day in the life of
Time with
Automobilia
Buyer's guides

References

External links
 Octane Magazine's new URL
 Octane Magazine's existing URL
 Dutch version of Octane Magazine
 German Octane Magazine

Magazines established in 2003
Automobile magazines published in the United Kingdom
Monthly magazines published in the United Kingdom